Adam Ciołkosz (January 5, 1901 – October 1, 1978) was a Polish scout, soldier, publicist and politician, who was one of the most important leaders of the Polish Socialist Party, both in the Second Polish Republic and in exile during and after World War II.

Early life and education

Ciołkosz was born in Kraków, but a year later his family moved to Tarnów. His father, Kasper, was an active progressive and independence agitator.  His mother, Maria Idzikowska, was the daughter of a veteran of the January Uprising. He graduated from a Gymnasium in Tarnów and later studied law at the Jagiellonian University.  While a student, Ciołkosz became a member of the socialists movement.

Scouting and fighting for independence

In Gymnasium, Ciołkosz joined 1st Scouts Squad, "Zawisza Czarny".  Later, he was a founder and organizer of scouting in Zakopane.  During World War I, he lived in Vienna and still was active. In October 1918, he and National Emergency Squads of the Polish Scouts, which he had formed and led with POWs, forced Austrian forces to surrender in Tarnów.  In November, he was one of the young scouts who participated in battle for Lwów. In 1919, Ciołkosz was promoted to a junior lieutenant.  He was also an organizer of Polish scouting movement in Warmia and Mazury and fought during Silesian Uprising.

Political career
In 1928, he was elected a Sejm Member from the Polish Socialist Party.  He was re-elected in 1930, but this time Sanacja authorities didn't allowed him to take office as with many others of the opposition.

He was one of the most outspoken critics of the Sanacja regime and was tried and sentenced to three years in prison during Brest trials in 1931 for plotting anti-government coup. After the German invasion into Poland in 1939, Ciołkosz, his wife Lidia Kahan was of Jewish descent (also a prominent socialist from UJ), and son Andrzej Ciołkosz fled first to Romania, and later France and England. His son died at the age of 23 in 1952, having translated Herling a year earlier.

Ciołkosz was an active politician in exile and soon was elected party leader.  He led PPS in exile until his death in London. A strong anti-Stalinist, he opposed Soviet domination in the Eastern Europe after 1945. His wife died in 2002 at age of 99.

References

External links
 Gustaw Herling-Grudziński, Socjalista jakich coraz mniej – o Adamie Ciołkoszu
 Wywiad z prof. Anną Siwik: Demokratyczny socjalizm Ciołkosza
 Adam Ciołkosz, Najnowsza taktyka komunistów, 1937

1901 births
1978 deaths
Jagiellonian University alumni
People from Tarnów
Polish socialists
Politicians from Kraków
Polish Austro-Hungarians
Polish Scouts and Guides
Polish emigrants to the United Kingdom
Polish people of the Polish–Soviet War
Polish people of the Polish–Ukrainian War
Members of the Sejm of the Second Polish Republic (1928–1930)
Members of the Sejm of the Second Polish Republic (1930–1935)
People associated with the magazine "Kultura"